The glossary of the COVID-19 pandemic is a list of definitions of terms relating to the COVID-19 pandemic. The pandemic has created and popularized many terms relating to disease and videoconferencing.

A

B

C

D

E

F

H

I

L

M

N

O

P

Q

R

S

T

V

Z

External links
Glossary on the COVID-19 pandemic - Government of Canada
Lang, Cady (December 14, 2020). "Social Distancing, Doomscroll and Defund: The Words That Defined 2020". Time. 

Glossaries of biology
COVID-19 pandemic
Wikipedia glossaries using description lists